Land is a 2018 internationally co-produced drama film directed by Babak Jalali. It was screened in the Panorama section at the 68th Berlin International Film Festival.

Cast
 Griffin Burns as Eli
 Andrew J Katers as Peter
 Thomas R. Baker as Major Jacobs
 Rod Rondeaux as Raymond Yellow Eagle
 Wilma Pelly as Mary Yellow Eagle

References

External links
 

2018 films
2018 drama films
Italian drama films
French drama films
Dutch drama films
Mexican drama films
2010s English-language films
2010s French films
2010s Mexican films